Norwegian Talc AS is a manufacturer of talc located in Knarrevik in Fjell, Norway. It is owned by Omya.

History
In 1989, the company, which at the time had plants in Knarrevik, Altermark in Mo i Rana and in Framfjord in Vik, was sold to the Engstrøm Group of Sweden. Previously, the company had been owned by the Horn family of Bergen.

References

Manufacturing companies of Norway
Companies based in Hordaland
Fjell